The Lark Farm (Italian: La masseria delle allodole) is a 2007 Italian drama film directed by Paolo and Vittorio Taviani about the Armenian genocide.

Plot
The story, drawn from La masseria delle allodole, the best-selling novel by Antonia Arslan, tells about the Avakian clan, an Armenian family living in Turkey and having two houses. The Avakians feel convinced that the rising tide of Turkish hostility on the horizon means little to them and will scarcely affect their day-to-day lives. The Avakians do not pay attention to the warning signs, and set about preparing for a family reunion with the impending visit of two well-to-do sons - landowner Aram, who resides in Turkey, and Assadour, a physician living in Venice. These illusions come crashing down when a Turkish military regiment crops up at the house, annihilates every male member of the family and forces the ladies to trek off into the Syrian desert, where they will be left to rot. With them goes one of the little boys of the family, who was dressed as a girl in order not to be killed. Along the journey, the Turks continue to commit horrible atrocities, including forcing an Armenian mother to crush her newborn baby son to death. Meanwhile, a handsome Turkish officer (Moritz Bleibtreu) falls in love with Aram's daughter and makes an aggressive attempt to deliver her from certain death, even as the circumstances surrounding him attest to the astounding difficulty of doing so. Upon being given orders to burn the women alive, he chooses to behead her.

Cast
 Paz Vega as Nunik
 Moritz Bleibtreu as young officer
 Alessandro Preziosi as Egon
 Ángela Molina as Ismene
 Arsinée Khanjian as Armineh Avakian
 Mohammed Bakri as Nazim
 Tchéky Karyo as Aram Avakian
 Mariano Rigillo as Assadour
 Hristo Shopov as Isman
 Hristo Zhivkov as Sarkis
 André Dussollier as Col. Arkan
 Yvonne Sciò as Livia

See also
 Armenian genocide in culture

External links
 
 

2007 drama films
2007 films
Armenian genocide films
Italian drama films
2000s Italian-language films
Films directed by Paolo and Vittorio Taviani
2000s Italian films